Kotly, also known as Upper and Lower Kotly (Верхние и Нижние Котлы) is a locality in the south of Moscow on the right bank of the Moskva River.

The name Kotly (literally means Boilers) comes from two extinct villages. The locality has been existing since the late 14th century under the name of Kotyol (sing. for Boiler), a village on the Kotlovka River. In 1606, the armies of Ivan Bolotnikov and Vasily Shuisky collided near Kotly with the ensuing defeat of the former. In the 17th century, there used to be two villages named Verkhniye Kotly (Upper Kotly) to the south and Nizhniye Kotly (Lower Kotly) to the north. The latter was built on the spot of the ancient settlement of Kotyol.

Kotly was turned into a country house area in the mid-19th century. In 1892–1904, a famous Russian painter Vasili Vereshchagin lived in the Upper Kotly. In the 1930s, Kotly was engulfed by Moscow and turned into a residential area. Varshavskoye highway is the main street in Kotly.

"Nizhniye Kotly" (Lower Kotly) is the present-day railway commuter platform connected to Nagatinskaya Metro station.

Geography of Moscow